Rajya Sabha elections were held on various dates in 1969, to elect members of the Rajya Sabha, Indian Parliament's upper chamber.

Elections
Elections were held to elect members from various states.

Members elected
The following members are elected in the elections held in 1969. They are members for the term 1969-1975 and retire in year 1975, except in case of the resignation or death before the term.
The list is incomplete.

State - Member - Party

Bye-elections
The following bye elections were held in the year 1969.

State - Member - Party

 Andhra Pradesh - M Anandam - INC ( ele  11/03/1969 term till 1974 )
 Madhya Pradesh - D K Jadhav - INC ( ele  25/03/1969 term till 1970 )
 Punjab - Gurcharan Singh Tohra - SAD  ( ele  28/03/1969 term till 1970 )
 Punjab - Harcharan Singh Duggal - OTH ( ele  28/03/1969 term till 1970 )
 Madhya Pradesh - Sawai Singh Sisodia - INC ( ele  28/04/1969 term till 1970 )
 Uttar Pradesh - Phool Singh - INC ( ele  11/08/1969 term till 1972 ) dea 27/09/1970
 Uttar Pradesh - Mohan Lal Gautam - INC ( ele  14/08/1969 term till 1972 )
 TN - K Kalyanasudaram - DMK ( ele  23/09/1969 term till 1970 )
 Uttar Pradesh - Jagdish Chandra Dikshit - INC ( ele  23/09/1969 term till 1970 )

References

Rajya Sabha
1969